The Luberon ( or ; Provençal: Leberon  or Leberoun ) is a massif in central Provence in Southern France, part of the French Prealps. It is composed of three mountain ranges (from west to east): Lesser Luberon (Petit Luberon), Greater Luberon (Grand Luberon) and Eastern Luberon (Luberon oriental). The valleys north and south of them contain a number of towns and villages as well as agricultural land; the northern part is marked by the Calavon, while the southern part is characterised by the Durance.

The Luberon is often advertised under the name Lubéron (with an acute accent on top of the "e"); some dictionaries justify that the two spellings are interchangeable. The total number of inhabitants varies greatly between winter and summer, due to a massive influx of tourists during the warm season. It is a favourite destination for French high society and British and American visitors because of the pleasant and picturesque towns and villages, comfortable way of life, agricultural wealth, historical and cultural associations, as well as hiking trails. Samuel Beckett notably lived in Cave Bonelly, a vineyard near to Roussillon, during World War II. 

In the last two decades the Luberon has become known in the English-speaking world especially through a series of books by British author Peter Mayle chronicling his life as an expatriate settled in the Luberon village of Ménerbes. These are titled A Year in Provence, Toujours Provence and Encore Provence. Another of Mayle's books, a novel set in the Luberon, was made into a film called A Good Year (2006) directed by Ridley Scott, starring Russell Crowe and filmed in the region.

Flora and fauna
Luberon is particularly rich in biological diversity. There are known to be around 1,500 species of plants, accounting for 30% of the flora and fauna in France, 17,000 species and sub-species of insects with almost 2,300 species of Lepidoptera, or nearly 40% of species living in France, 341 species and subspecies of vertebrate wildlife, 135 species of birds and 21 species of bats or 70% of species present in France. Among the 1,500 different species of plants, there are 700 species and sub-species of higher plants and 200 species of lichens. Rich fossil deposits are also preserved here, documenting for example ancient species related to songbirds, as well as an ancestral pelican.

Nuclear facilities
The Force de frappe or French strategic nuclear arsenal used to be located on the Plateau d'Albion before being dismantled in the late 1980s. Now, the underground site where the missile controls were located is a public multidisciplinary laboratory of the University of Nice Sophia Antipolis, the Low Noise Underground Laboratory (LSBB) of Rustrel, Pays d'Apt.

Communes in the Parc naturel régional du Luberon

In Vaucluse

 Ansouis
 Apt, small town near the eastern end of the Luberon valley
 La Bastide-des-Jourdans
 La Bastidonne
 Beaumettes
 Beaumont-de-Pertuis
 Bonnieux
 Buoux
 Cabrières-d'Aigues
 Cadenet
 Caseneuve
 Cavaillon, small town at the western entrance to the Luberon valley
 Cheval-Blanc
 Cucuron
 Gargas
 Gordes
 Goult
 Grambois
 Joucas
 Lacoste
 Lagarde-d'Apt
 Lauris
 Lioux
 Lourmarin
 Maubec
 Ménerbes
 Mérindol
 Mirabeau
 Murs
 Oppède
 Pertuis
 Peypin-d'Aigues
 Puget
 Puyvert
 Robion
 Roussillon
 Rustrel
 Saignon
 Saint-Martin-de-Castillon
 Saint-Martin-de-la-Brasque
 Saint-Pantaléon
 Saint-Saturnin-lès-Apt
 Sannes
 Taillades
 La Tour-d'Aigues
 Vaugines
 Viens
 Villars
 Villelaure
 Vitrolles-en-Luberon

In Alpes-de-Haute-Provence

 Aubenas-les-Alpes
 La Brillanne
 Céreste
 Dauphin
 Forcalquier
 Limans
 Lurs
 Manosque
 Montfuron
 Montjustin
 Niozelles
 Oppedette
 Pierrerue
 Pierrevert
 Reillanne
 Revest-des-Brousses
 Saint-Maime
 Saint-Martin-les-Eaux
 Saint-Michel-l'Observatoire
 Sainte-Tulle
 Vachères
 Villemus
 Villeneuve
 Volx

Golden triangle of Luberon
Bonnieux, village on the border between the Little and Big Luberon
Gordes, facing the Luberon, this village is considered the top of the Golden Triangle (the base being made by the Little Luberon mountains)
Goult, perched on a hill in the middle of the valley of the Luberon
Lacoste and the ancient castle of the uncle of "le Marquis de Sade"
Ménerbes
Oppède with its historic section perched on the hillside Oppéde-le-Vieux
Roussillon, like Goult, perched on a hill within the Luberon valley

Southern Luberon
Lourmarin, village on the border between Little and Big Luberon
Cucuron
Pavillon de Galon

References

Further reading
Mayle, Peter. A Year in Provence. New York: Vintage Books, 1989.
Mayle, Peter. Encore Provence: New Adventures in the South of France. New York: Knopf, 1999.
Mayle, Peter. Toujours Provence. New York: Knopf, 1991.

External links

Discover the Luberon on Notreprovence.fr in English
Aerial photos Luberon
Photo essay - Experience the Luberon

Geography of Alpes-de-Haute-Provence
Geography of Vaucluse
Biosphere reserves of France
Global Geoparks Network members
Geoparks in France
Provence-Alpes-Côte d'Azur region articles needing translation from French Wikipedia